Timon of Athens may refer to:

Timon of Athens, a historical figure who lived during the era of the Peloponnesian War.

Fiction:
Timon of Athens, a play by William Shakespeare about the historical figure.
Timon of Athens (Thomas Shadwell), a rewrite of Shakespeare's original play by Thomas Shadwell
 BBC Television Shakespeare - Third Season - Timon of Athena (1981) directed by Jonathan Miller